Chilukurivarigudem is a village in Mylavaram mandal, Vijayawada division, Krishna District, Andhra Pradesh, India. It comes under the constituency of Mylavaram, Pulluru Panchayat.
The main economic activity is agriculture. The village is known in district for its fruit orchards, paddy and mango groves.

Geography
It has an average elevation of 47 metres (157 feet). The village is located 11 km away from Mylavaram along National Highway 221 (India) towards Bhadrachalam.

External links

Wikimapia
SASRZPHS Schools World

Villages in Krishna district